Booker High School is a public high school located in Booker, Texas (USA) and classified as a 1A school by the UIL.  It is part of the Booker Independent School District located in north central Lipscomb County. In 2015, the school was rated "Met Standard" by the Texas Education Agency.

Academics
The Booker Kiowas compete in UIL academics.

State Titles
Computer Science
2015(2A) Team 
2015(2A) Individual 
2013(1A) Team 

Feature Writing
1996(1A) Individual
1972(1A) Individual
Editorial Writing
1993(1A) Individual
Boys Poetry Reading
1959(1A) Individual
Boys Prose Reading
1970(1A) Individual
Extemporaneous Speech
1956(1A) Individual

Athletics
The Booker Kiowas compete in these sports - 

Cross country, football, basketball, golf, tennis, track, baseball and softball.

State titles
Girls' Cross Country - 
1992(1A)
Boys' Golf - 
1974(B), 1993(1A), 1995(1A), 1996(1A)
Girls' Golf - 
1975(B), 1976(B), 1977(B), 1980(B), 1986(1A), 1987(1A), 1988(1A), 1989(1A), 1990(1A), 1991(1A), 1992(1A), 1993(1A)
Boys' Track - 
1964(B), 1965(B)

Individual Titles

Track
1968 Boys' 880 yard Individual 
1969 Boys' Mile Run Individual 
1988 Girls' 400 Relay 
Tennis
1996(1A) Girls' Doubles 
1981(1A) Boys' Singles

Band
UIL Marching Band Sweepstakes Champion - 
1980(B), 1983(1A)

References

External links
Booker ISD

Schools in Lipscomb County, Texas
Public high schools in Texas